Majdan Siostrzytowski is a village in the administrative district of Gmina Trawniki, within Świdnik County, Lublin Voivodeship, in eastern Poland.

References

Majdan Siostrzytowski